This is a list of notable people from Adelaide.

Arts and music
Prominent intellectuals, writers, artists, bands, and musicians to hail from Adelaide include:

Actors
Dame Judith Anderson  - Rebecca, And Then There Were None; Tony and Emmy Award winner
Elspeth Ballantyne - Prisoner
Holly Brisley - Home and Away
Sam Clark - Neighbours
Kate Fischer  - Sirens
Sir Robert Helpmann  - Chitty Chitty Bang Bang, Alice's Adventures in Wonderland
Nicholas Hope - Bad Boy Bubby
Dichen Lachman - Neighbours, Dollhouse
Anthony LaPaglia - Without a Trace
Jonathan LaPaglia - Seven Days, The District
Glenn McMillan - Wonderland
Ben Oxenbould - Hey Dad..!
Teresa Palmer  - December Boys, I Am Number Four
Lois Ramsey - Road to Nhill, Home and Away
Xavier Samuel - The Twilight Saga: Eclipse
Hugh Sheridan - Packed to the Rafters
Sarah Snook - Succession; Golden Globe winner

Sonia Todd - McLeod's Daughters
Melanie Vallejo - Winners and Losers
Samara Weaving

Comedians
Anthony "Lehmo" Lehmann - comedian
Richard Marsland
Shaun Micallef 
Greig Pickhaver  - aka "H.G. Nelson"
Roy Rene - aka "Mo McCackie"
Frank Woodley

Film directors
Mario Andreacchio
David James Campbell
Alex Frayne
Rolf de Heer
Scott Hicks
Pip Karmel
Anthony Maras
Michael James Rowland
Murali K. Thalluri
Eddie White

Humanities
Graeme Hugo - demographer and Federation Fellow (2002)
J. J. C. Smart - philosopher
Hugh Stretton - historian and sociologist
Peter Sutton - anthropologist
Ghil'ad Zuckermann - linguist and revivalist
Wesley Wildman - philosopher, theologian, ethicist

Journalists
 Annabel Crabb - political writer and commentator
Brady Haran  - independent video journalist and Internet personality
Jenni Hogan - TV reporter and host, Emmy Award winner
 Christian Kerr - political commentator and journalist
Bruce McAvaney  - sports broadcaster
 Hamish McLachlan - television sports commentator for the Seven Network
 David Penberthy - editor-in-chief of the Australian newspaper The Daily Telegraph

Musicians and bands
Allday
The Angels
At Sunset
The Beards
Tkay Maidza
Atlas Genius 
The Audreys
Jimmy Barnes
Beeb Birtles
Bit By Bats
David Campbell
Wes Carr
Julian Cochran
Cold Chisel
Beccy Cole 
Michael Crafter
Delta (hip hop artist)
Fraternity
Funkoars
Peter Furler
Dave Graney 
Angie Hart
Hilltop Hoods
The Hot Lies
I Killed the Prom Queen
Jim Keays
Paul Kelly
Rachael Leahcar
Lowrider
The Mark of Cain
The Masters Apprentices
Reece Mastin
Sarah McLeod
Sia
Sister Janet Mead
Orianthi Panagaris 
Redgum
Aleesha Rome
Guy Sebastian
Glenn Shorrock
Benjamin Speed
The Superjesus
Rudy Nikkerud
Swanee
Michelle Tumes
The Twilights
Universum
Virgin Black
Wolf & Cub

Visual artists
James Ashton - painter and arts educator
Dorrit Black - modernist printmaker and painter
Michal Dutkiewicz - comic book artist and illustrator, three-time winner of the Stanley Award
Robert Hannaford  - portrait artist, three-time winner of the People's Choice Award of the Archibald Prize
Barbara Hanrahan - artist, printmaker and writer
Sir Hans Heysen  - landscape painter, nine-time winner of the Wynne Prize
Nora Heysen  - portrait artist, first female winner of the Archibald Prize
Ondrej Mares - sculptor and furniture maker
Joseph Stanislaus Ostoja-Kotkowski  - painting, photography, film-making, theatre design, fabric design, murals, kinetic and static sculpture, stained glass, vitreous enamel murals, op-collages, computer graphics, and laser art
Jeffrey Smart  - precisionist landscape painter
Geoffrey Proud - portrait artist, landscape artist, sculpture artist, winner of the 1990 Archibald Prize, winner of the 1975 Sulman Prize
Susan Dorothea White - painter, sculptor and printmaker

Writers
Malcolm Afford - playwright and novelist
Guy Boothby - novelist and travel writer
James Bradley - novelist and critic
Brian Castro -  novelist
Nancy Cato - author
J M Coetzee - novelist and essayist, winner of the Nobel Prize in Literature
Aidan Coleman - poet
David Conyers - science fiction author
Geoffrey Dutton  - poet, author and historian, winner of the Grace Leven Prize for Poetry
Max Fatchen  - journalist and children's author
Mem Fox  - educator and children's author
Peter Goldsworthy  - novelist, poet and scriptwriter, winner of the Helpmann Award
Christine Harris - children's and young adult author
Max Harris  - poet, critic and columnist
Vernon Knowles - fantasy author
Kym Lardner - children's author, illustrator, and storyteller
Caleb Lewis - playwright
DBC Pierre - novelist, winner of the Man Booker Prize
Gillian Rubinstein - children's author and playwright
Bel Schenk - poet
Tony Shillitoe - fantasy author
Tim Sinclair - poet and novelist 
Hugh Stretton - historian and sociologist
Anne Summers - feminist writer and editor
Colin Thiele  - children's author and educator, winner of the Dromkeen medal
David Thorne - humorist and satirist
Russel Ward - historian and author of The Australian Legend 
Sean Williams - science fiction author
Ben Winch - novelist
Nan Witcomb - poet
Laetitia Withall - poet, author and suffragette

Business and media
 Rick Allert  - accountant, company director and chairperson
 Balfours family - bakery founders
 Barr Smith family - businessmen and philanthropists
 Matt Barrie - entrepreneur, CEO Freelancer Limited
 Shaun Bonétt - property developer, entrepreneur and philanthropist
 Cooper family - brewery founders
 Thomas Elder  - pastoralist, politician and philanthropist
 Gerard family - founders of Clipsal
 Edward Hayward  - owner and manager of John Martins
 Sir Sidney Kidman - pastoralist, entrepreneur and landowner
 Matthew and Zbigniew Michalewicz - entrepreneurs and co-founders of SolveIT Software
 Rupert Murdoch  - media mogul, chairperson and CEO of News Corporation
 Mary Penfold - winemaker
 John Spalvins - managing director of Adelaide Steamship Company
 Robert Stigwood - impresario, entertainment entrepreneur and film producer
 Michael Tunn - radio announcer and program director
 Gary Turner - producer, record company owner and founder of LearnToPlayMusic.com

Law and politics
Julie Bishop - Minister for Foreign Affairs and the Deputy Leader of the Liberal Party of Australia
Sir John Langdon Bonython - member of the first Australian parliament
Sir John Lavington Bonython - Mayor and Lord Mayor of Adelaide
Michael Bradley - mayor of Sarnia, Ontario, Canada
 James Crawford - Legal academic and Judge of the International Court of Justice (2014)
Mario Despoja - leader of the Croatian community in Australia
Natasha Stott Despoja  - senator and leader of the Australian Democrats
Alexander Downer  - Foreign Affairs Minister and Leader of the Opposition
Alexander Downer, Sr. - member of the House of Representatives and High Commissioner to London
John Downer  - twice Premier of South Australia
John Finnis - Professor of Law at University College, Oxford
Julia Gillard - Prime Minister and leader of the Australian Labor Party
Janine Haines - senator and leader of the Australian Democrats
Sir Charles Kingston - Premier of South Australia and Minister for Trade and Customs in the first Commonwealth parliament
Dame Roma Mitchell  - Australia's first female QC, first female judge, and first female Governor
Christopher Pyne - Minister for Defence
Catherine Helen Spence - suffragist, electoral reformer, prohibitionist, and first female political candidate in Australia
Ian Wilson - member of the Australian House of Representatives and Minister for Aboriginal Affairs
Sir Keith Wilson - senator and member of the Australian House of Representatives
List of Mayors and Lord Mayors of Adelaide
List of Premiers of South Australia
:Category: Federal politicians from South Australia

Science
World-renowned Adelaide scientists include:
Len Beadell  - surveyor, roadbuilder and explorer; asteroid 3161 Beadell is named after him
William Henry Bragg  - physicist, chemist and mathematician, winner of the Nobel Prize in Physics
William Lawrence Bragg  - physicist and crystallographer, winner of the Nobel Prize in Physics and youngest Nobel Laureate
Rodney Brooks - roboticist, director of the MIT Computer Science and Artificial Intelligence Laboratory and founding member of the iRobot corporation
Baron Howard Florey  - pharmacologist and pathologist, winner of the Nobel Prize in Physiology or Medicine
Basil Stuart Hetzel AC - medical researcher who made a major contribution to combating iodine deficiency
Cecil Madigan - geologist and meteorologist, member of the Australasian Antarctic Expedition
Sir Douglas Mawson  - geologist and explorer, leader of the Australasian Antarctic Expedition
Sir Mark Oliphant  - nuclear physicist, winner of the Hughes Medal and the Faraday Medal
Reg Sprigg  - geologist and conservationist
 George Szekeres  - mathematician, after whom the George Szekeres Medal is named. 
Terence Tao  - mathematician, winner of the Fields Medal
Andy Thomas  - aerospace engineer and NASA astronaut
David Unaipon - inventor and writer, commemorated on the Australian fifty-dollar note
Robin Warren  - pathologist and researcher, winner of the Nobel Prize in Medicine
Sir Hubert Wilkins - Antarctic aviation pioneer, Arctic explorer, ornithologist and geographer

Sport
Internationally and nationally recognised sports people from Adelaide include:

Aerobatics
Chris Sperou - thirteen-time National Aerobatics Champion, and five-time participant in the FAI World Aerobatic Championships

Archery
Simon Fairweather  - Olympic gold medalist

Australian rules football
Nathan Buckley - captained the Collingwood Football Club, winner of the Brownlow Medal
Adam Cooney - player for the Western Bulldogs and the Essendon Football Club, winner of the Brownlow Medal
Matthew Pavlich - captained the Fremantle Football Club
Adelaide Football Club players
Port Adelaide Football Club players

Basketball
Mark Bradtke - played one season in the NBA for the Philadelphia 76ers, played in the NBL for the Adelaide 36ers, Melbourne Tigers and Brisbane Bullets; three-time NBL Championship winner and 2002 NBL Most Valuable Player; NBL's all-time leading rebounder; played for the Australian Boomers in four Olympic Games and two World Championships
Lindsay Gaze - played for the Australian Boomers in three Olympics and coached the team in four Olympics; two-time NBL Championship winning coach, three-time NBL Coach of the Year; member of the Australian Basketball Hall of Fame, FIBA Hall of Fame and the Naismith Memorial Basketball Hall of Fame
Joe Ingles - plays for the Utah Jazz in the NBA. He also represents the Australian Boomers.
Ben Madgen - plays in the NBL for the Sydney Kings
Brett Maher - played in the NBL for the Adelaide 36ers, captained the team to three Championships, played in three Olympic Games for the Australian Boomers
Mike McKay - played in the NBL for the West Adelaide Bearcats, Adelaide 36ers, Brisbane Bullets, Canberra Cannons and Wollongong Hawks; won the 1985 Rookie of the Year and 1986 NBL championship with the 36ers; played for the Australian Boomers at the 1992 Summer Olympics
Brad Newley - plays in Spain for CB Gran Canaria, drafted to the NBA by the Houston Rockets; has played for the Australian Boomers in the Olympic Games, World Championships and Commonwealth Games
Erin Phillips - plays in the WNBA for the Phoenix Mercury, played for the Connecticut Sun, won a championship with the Indiana Fever, played in the WNBL for the Adelaide Lightning, Olympic silver medalist and FIBA gold medalist with the Australian Opals
Luke Schenscher - 7'1" (216 cm) tall Centre, played in the NBA for the Chicago Bulls and the Portland Trail Blazers; plays in the NBL for the Adelaide 36ers; played in the East Asian Games for the Australian Boomers in 2001 while still in high school; member of the 2003–04 NCAA All-Final Four Team
Phil Smyth  - played in the NBL for the St Kilda Saints, Canberra Cannons, Adelaide 36ers and Sydney Kings; won three championships as a player at Canberra and coached the 36ers to three Championship wins; played for the Australian Boomers in four Olympic Games and five World Championships; captained the Boomers from 1983-1995

Cricket
Greg Blewett - played for the Australian national cricket team
Sir Donald Bradman  - captained Australia, all-time highest Test batting average of any player with 99.94 (Note: Bradman was born in Cootamundra, New South Wales in 1908 and moved to Adelaide in 1934)
Greg Chappell  - captained Australia
Ian Chappell - captained Australia
Trevor Chappell - played for Australia
Albert Gillespie - played first-class cricket in England
Jason Gillespie - played for Australia
George Goodfellow - played first-class cricket in England
Clem Hill - captained Australia
David Hookes - played for Australia
Barry Jarman  - captained Australia
Arthur G. Jenkins - first South Australian to umpire a cricket Test match
Darren Lehmann - played for Australia; current (2015) coach of the Australian team
Wayne Phillips - played for Australia 
Vic Richardson  - captained Australia; won Magarey Medal (Australian Rules Football) and represented Australia in Baseball; grandfather of Ian, Greg and Trevor Chappell
Shaun Tait - plays for Australia

Cycling
Alex Edmondson - Commonwealth Games Team pursuit champion, World individual pursuit champion 2014 
Annette Edmondson - Commonwealth Games gold medalist 2014, Olympic bronze medalist in the omnium 2012
Matthew Glaetzer - Olympic gold, silver and bronze medalist for the Australian Cyclist team since 2009
Alexandra Manly - professional cyclist at Orica-AIS
Stephanie Morton - Commonwealth Games Individual Sprint Champion 2014
Stuart O'Grady  - Olympic gold medalist in the Men's Madison, silver and bronze medalist in the 4000m Team Pursuit, bronze medalist in the Points Race, and four-time second-place finisher in the Tour de France
Michael Turtur  - Olympic gold medalist in the Team Pursuit, and Race Director of the Tour Down Under
Kimberley Wells - two-time national criterium champion, and current professional cyclist.
Sam Willoughby - Olympic silver medalist in the men's BMX and UCI BMX world champion

Darts
Barry Atkinson - professional darts player
Rob Modra - two-time Geelong Open Darts Championships

Golf
Geoff Ogilvy - U.S. Open winner and three-time World Golf Championships winner
Adam Scott - U.S. Masters winner and World number one

Kickboxing
Frank Giorgi - two-time Australian champion and world Super Middleweight champion
Paul Slowinski - four-time Muay Thai world champion

Motor sports
John Boulger - two-time Australian Speedway Champion, nine-time South Australian Champion, captained Australia to win the Speedway World Team Cup
Jeremy Burgess - MotoGP engineer, helped Wayne Gardner, Mick Doohan and Valentino Rossi to 12 World Championships
Garrie Cooper - founder of Elfin Sports Cars, Australian 1½ Litre Champion, Australian Sports Car Champion and Singapore Grand Prix winner
Daniel Falzon - two-time Australian Superbike Champion
Steve Martin - Superbike World Championship veteran and World Endurance Champion
Billy McConnell - competes in the British Supersport Championship
Nick Percat - V8 Supercar driver, Australian Formula Ford Champion and Bathurst 1000 winner
Vern Schuppan - Formula One driver, 24 Hours of Le Mans winner and Indianapolis 500 Rookie of the Year
Johnnie Walker - Australian Drivers' Champion and Australian Grand Prix winner
Jack Young - two-time Speedway World Champion and nine-time South Australian Champion

Professional wrestling
Rhea Ripley - signed to the WWE, current 2023 Women’s Royal Rumble winner; former 1/2 of the WWE Women's Tag Team Champions; former Raw Women's Champion former NXT Women's Champion & former NXT UK Women's Champion (as well as being the inaugural champion for the latter).

Soccer
Dianne Alagich - played in the Women's United Soccer Association for the San Jose CyberRays, played for the Matildas
John Aloisi - played in La Liga, Premier League and Serie A, played for the Socceroos at the FIFA World Cup
Diana Hall - played for the Matildas
Awer Mabil - plays for FC Midtjylland
Alex Tobin - captained the Socceroos
Aurelio Vidmar - captained the Socceroos
Tony Vidmar - played for the Socceroos
Adelaide United FC players

Sport aerobics
Kylie Halliday - placed second at the Aerobic Gymnastics World Championships

Swimming 
 Kyle Chalmers - 2016 Summer Olympics gold medalist in the 100m freestyle
 Emily Seebohm - 2012 Summer Olympics gold medalist in the 4 × 100 metre freestyle relay and 2008 Summer Olympics gold medalist in the 4 × 100 metre medley relay

Tennis
Darren Cahill - Australian Open doubles finalist, US Open singles semi-finalist
Lleyton Hewitt - U.S. Open and Wimbledon winner and World number one
Alicia Molik - Australian Open and French Open doubles winner, reached World top ten singles ranking
Mark Woodforde  - two-time Australian Open, one-time French Open, six-time Wimbledon, and three-time French Open doubles winner; Olympic gold and silver medalist; World number one

Trampoline gymnastics
Blake Gaudry - 2012 Summer Olympics competitor, Australian Gymnastics Championships Winner

Volleyball 
 Kerri Pottharst  (born 1965) - Olympic gold and bronze medalist in beach volleyball
 Tania Gooley-Humphry (born 1973) - beach volleyball and indoor volleyball player
 Andrew Schacht (born 1973) - beach volleyball player
 Tamsin Hinchley (born 1980) - volleyball player
 Becchara Palmer (born 1988) - beach volleyball player

Other
Garry Gordon Cooper -  retired airline captain, ex RAAF pilot
Gladys Elphick - Australian Aboriginal active in Aboriginal affairs
David Hicks - former Guantanamo Bay inmate, falsely convicted of 'providing material support to terrorism'

See also

List of University of Adelaide people

References

 
People
Adelaide